Tarif may refer to:
Mowafaq Tarif (born 1963), Druze Israeli spiritual leader
Salah Tarif (born 1954), Druze Israeli politician
Salih ibn Tarif, the second king of the Berghouata Berber kingdom
 Tarif Ahmed (born 1985), Indian footballer
 Tarif Khalidi (born 1938), Palestinian historian
 Tarif al-Matghari (died 744), founder of the Berber Barghawata dynasty in the Tamesna region in Morocco

Places 
 Tarif Kalba - settlement in Sharjah Emirate, UAE
 Tarif, Emirate of Abu Dhabi|Tarif - settlement in UAE
 El-Tarif - ancient Egyptian necropolis near Luxor, Egypt

See also
Tarifa